The Chief Secretary of South Australia (since 1856) or Colonial Secretary of South Australia (1836–1856) was a key role in the governance of the Colony of South Australia (1836–1900) and State of South Australia (from 1901) until it was abolished in 1989. It was the main executive and coordinating authority of government administration. It was the official channel of communication to the Governor of South Australia from government departments and the general public.

The Premier's Department was created in 1965, and over time assumed the functions of the Chief Secretary's Office.

List of Colonial and Chief Secretaries of South Australia

References

See also
Chief Secretary - a generic description of the role in British colonies

Government of South Australia
South Australia
Colony of South Australia